Munawar Hussain (13 August 1914 – 26 March 2003) was a Pakistani cricket umpire. He stood in five Test matches between 1959 and 1969.

See also
 List of Test cricket umpires

References

1914 births
2003 deaths
Cricketers from Lahore
Pakistani Test cricket umpires